Davide Angelo Ghislandi (born 16 June 2001) is an Italian professional footballer who plays as a wing-back for  club Triestina, on loan from Atalanta.

Club career 
Ghislandi made his professional debut with Atalanta as a substitute a 5–1 Serie A win over Crotone on 3 March 2021.

On 11 July 2022, Ghislandi was loaned to Triestina.

References

External links
 
 
 FIGC U15 Profile
 FIGC U16 Profile
 FIGC U17 Profile
 FIGC U18 Profile
 FIGC U19 Profile

2001 births
Living people
People from Treviglio
Italian footballers
Italy youth international footballers
Association football fullbacks
Atalanta B.C. players
S.S. Turris Calcio players
U.S. Triestina Calcio 1918 players
Serie A players
Serie C players
Sportspeople from the Province of Bergamo
Footballers from Lombardy